Elections to Midlothian County Council were held on 10 May 1955. Midlothian was one of the four divisions that made up the historic region of Lothian in Scotland. The Local Government (Scotland) Act 1889 established Midlothian as an administrative county, governed by a County Council.

The county was divided into 39 electoral divisions, each of which returned one member. In 1955 there were contests in 16 of these.

Following the election the council was composed of 24 Labourites, 13 Progressives/Moderates, and two Communists.

Aggregate results

Results by division

References

Notes

1955 Scottish local elections
1955